Chamaecrypta is a genus of flowering plants belonging to the family Scrophulariaceae.

Its native range is Southern Africa.

Species:
 Chamaecrypta diasciifolia Schltr. & Diels

References

Scrophulariaceae
Scrophulariaceae genera